The 1953 season was FC Steaua București's 6th season since its founding in 1947.

Friendly matches

Divizia A

League table

Results

Source:

Cupa României

Results

See also

 1953 Cupa României
 1953 Divizia A

Notes and references

External links
 1953 FC Steaua București Divizia A matches

FC Steaua București seasons
1953–54 in Romanian football
1952–53 in Romanian football
Steaua, București
Steaua, București
Steaua
Steaua
Romanian football championship-winning seasons